Jimmy Ryan may refer to:

Sports
 Jimmy Ryan (baseball) (1863–1923), American baseball player
 Jimmy Ryan (Australian footballer) (1879–1954), for Collingwood
 Jimmy Ryan (footballer, born 1945), English football player
 Jimmy Ryan (footballer, born 1988), English footballer with Fleetwood Town F.C.

Music
 Jimmy Ryan (musician) (fl. 1990s), American mandolinist
 Jimmy Ryan (vocalist), heavy metal vocalist
 Jimmy Ryan's (1934–1983), jazz club in New York City

See also
 James Ryan (disambiguation)
 Jim Ryan (disambiguation)